Anwar ul Haq or Anwarul Haq, (meaning "lights of the Truth"),  is a male Muslim given name. Notable bearers of the name include:

Sheikh Anwarul Haq (1917–1995), Pakistani jurist, Chief Justice of Pakistan 
Anwar ul Haq Ahadi (born 1951), Afghan Minister of Finance
Anwarul Haque (1956–2017), Bangladeshi Supreme Court justice
Anwar ul Haq Mujahid (born 1967), militant leader in eastern Afghanistan
Anwar ul Haq Kakar, Member of the Senate of Pakistan

Arabic masculine given names